A sulfide deposit is an ore body or rock containing a great deal of sulfide minerals.

Articles on this topic include:

Seafloor massive sulfide deposits
Sedimentary exhalative deposits
Volcanogenic massive sulfide ore deposit
Massive sulfide deposits